Fred "Johnny" Hayward (1887 – 22 October 1958) was an English footballer who played as a striker.

Early life 
Fred "Johnny" Hayward was the youngest of the seven children of glove cutter William Henry Hayward and his glove machinist wife Mary Ann née Tutchings. William and Mary's children, all born in Yeovil, were; Bessie, Alice, Rose, Lilly, Charles, Louie and Fred. In the 1891 census the family were listed living at 49 Wellington Street. By the time of the 1901 census, the family had moved to 141 Huish and 14-year-old Johnny was working as a solicitor's clerk. His career in law was short lived and most of his working life was spent as a glove cutter like his father. He started his football career, playing in his local football league, for Boys Brigade Baptist FC. Despite this, reports say that Hayward's early sporting achievements came in cricket. In July 1904, Fred averaged 40 with the bat and once taking 6 for 10 whilst playing for the YMCA. Come December 1906, Hayward was selected to play for a select league team against Yeovil Casuals at Pen Mill, scoring in a 2–2 draw.

Club career 
Hayward made his debut in the April 1907, starting in a 2–1 loss against Warminster Town scoring Yeovil Casuals’ only goal.

1907–1908
Normally the natural progression would be from the 'A' team (Reserves) and to work your way into the Senior side. Hayward, however, was straight into the first team. In their first match of the season a friendly against Upton Park from London. Hayward drew a blank in a 4–3 defeat. It was to be a rare blank though, in the next 26 matches he would play, he would score in 21 of them. It hadn't gone unnoticed, within three months, Hayward had rightly earned his first call up as a reserve for the Somerset County team to play Devon at Pen Mill in mid-January 1908, alas not making the team, much to the condemnation of the Yeovil footballing public. His chance came though, earning his first Somerset cap a month later against Hampshire at Moordown in front of 3,000. In a 5–2 defeat, Hayward, was praised for his performance, marking it with a goal. By the end of the season Hayward had scored 41 goals.

1908–1909 
Scoring an incredible 18 goals by the end of December in just 15 games. At Home Park, Plymouth, in November 1908, he also scored both goals in a famous victory for Somerset over a very strong Devon County-side. For Glovers fans, if he wasn't a hero already, scoring five goals in a 9–1 victory over traditional rivals Weymouth in January 1909. The 1908–09 season ended up with Yeovil capturing the prestigious Dorset championship, after a 3–0 win over Branksome Gasworks at Dorchester. Hayward scored 33 goals this season.

1909–1910
The following season 1909–10, word was circulating that Fred's displays were being closely monitored by Exeter City, he had played and scored against them in a number of friendly matches. Although scoring regularly, his scoring feats were not matching that of his previous two seasons. With a fine FA Cup run, the Glovers had reached the last qualifying round of the before the first round proper, the furthest they had achieved so far. A trip to the capital against the famous amateur team Clapton was the reward. Fred's reputation had obviously travelled as the London Press had singled him out as one of the best amateur players in the whole of the West of England and the Yeovil danger man. On the day, in a one way match with chances few for the Somerset wide, Fred and Yeovil travelled back to Somerset defeated 6–1. Something mysterious was happening surrounding Fred Hayward in February 1910, he had failed to turn out in the 2–1 home win against Frome , the first win of the season in the Somerset league. It had been known for some time Exeter had been keeping further tabs on the young talented striker. A few days later, the Exeter City press announced that Hayward had signed Southern League forms at St James Park and was making his debut for The Grecians a couple of days later against St Luke's College. This season Fred scored 22 goals.

1910–1911 
Fred had his third best scoring season to date as he scored 31 goals in 32 games.

1911–1912 
Fred had one of poorer seasons, despite picking up 23 goals in 21 games.

1912–1913 
At the start of the 1912–13  season, Fred was absent, with very good reason. He was in Weston-super-Mare on honeymoon with his new bride Mabel Harbour. However, Fred brought more silverware to the club with the Somerset Senior League and Charity Cup captured. However, Fred's greatest feat of the season, and arguably his career, was his goals for the County. Somerset, in reaching the Southern Counties final for the first time in its history, were rewarded with a final against Middlesex at Pen Mill, Yeovil. A wet and windy day didn't stop nearly 3000 turning out for the final and to see Johnny. Hayward again didn't disappoint, scoring two in a 4–1 win, a result celebrated in all of Somerset. Fred was brilliant this season scoring 36 goals in 26 games.

1913–1914 
During 1914, the two senior teams in the town, Yeovil Town and Petters United  had come to the conclusion that an amalgamation would be the best move forward to widen the appeal of football in the town and to expand into the wider world of the ever growing sport. Something that 'Johnny' voiced his disapproval of, although promising to do his best for his home town in whatever happened. At the end of the season, Johnny played, and as far as it is known, his one and only match for another club when he pulled on the amber and black strip of Petters United at Brickyard Lane in a Wiltshire League match against Melksham Town. He scored four of the goals in a 14–0 hammering of the Wiltshire side. On the 7 March 1914, Yeovil Town played Bournemouth Wanderers in the Dorset and District League and beat them 3–1, with Johnny scoring 2 of the goals.

1919–1920 
When 'Johnny' eventually returned to football, after the war, he was approaching thirty-two years of age. Amalgamation now complete, he found himself in the new style and unfamiliar strip of white shirts and navy blue shorts for the highly ambitious Yeovil & Petters United. He also found himself technically in a higher standard of football as Yeovil had entered, for the first time, into the Western League Division Two. If opponents thought the horrors of war, a few years off and age would slow Fred down, they were quickly kicked into touch. If anything, he'd come back stronger, scoring 4 goals in 5 matches and in one match against the Royal Tank Corp, banged in 6 goals in a nine-nil victory. A year later, Yeovil applied to and were accepted in the higher Western League One. Far from the provincial towns of Somerset, Dorset and Hampshire, matches further afield would be undertaken, mostly in Wales against the professional reserve sides of clubs such as Cardiff City, Swansea Town, Barry Town along with Bristol City and Bristol Rovers. This wasn't a challenge for him, as he finished the season averaging over a goal a game, scoring 52 goals in 33 games.

1920–1921 
The 1920–1921 season was another great season for Hayward scoring a hat trick against Bristol City Reserves at the last game of the season and in total, 43 goals in 35 games.

1921–1922 
Fred’s 1921–1922 campaign was his best yet, scoring 60 goals.

1922–1923 
Another step up in football was made in the 1922–23 season when the club entered the Southern League, again resulting in matches even further away from home. All the way from Devon to Norfolk. Additionally the club had now become a professional outfit, under their first player manager Jack Gregory, who knew a good striker when he saw one. Fred, now 35, welcomed the professional wage of his club and continued his trade in the Gloving industry with an ever growing family the two wages would have been most welcome. The superlatives were running out for 'Johnny', at an age when most strikers are looking to polish the medals and lay in bed reliving past glories, yet, Fred kept going. Scoring 6 goals in a 12–1 FA Cup victory over Westbury United. In total Fred scored 30 goals.

1923–1924 
Hardly a match went by in the 1923–24 season where the name Hayward was not printed on the score sheet, clinching the Southern League Western section, at the time the highest achievement at that time, in the club's history, assisted with his 38 goals.

1924–1925 
This season was Fred’s last season as Yeovil Town’s top scorer, scoring 29 goals.

1925–1926 
Harry Scott took over Fred Hayward in the top goalscorers list in the 1925–26 season.

1926–1927 
The club were now looking nationwide for players. However, even at 39 years old, Fred, when playing, took his chances. Scoring two hat tricks in a week in September against Exeter City in the Southern League and Street in a 10–1 FA Cup win. The chances for the first team became less, and by March Fred found himself mostly in the reserves, playing at the likes of Portland and Branksome Gas. A visit to Newport, Wales to play Lovells Athletic on the 7 May 1927, one wonders the emotions that were running through Fred 'Johnny' Hayward's head. He was in the reserves again, facing this long trip into the principality. A man who had given, minus war years, twenty years of his life to the club, a club which with his achievements had allowed the Glovers to grow and grow. Yet, now facing his last game in the Green and White, in Wales. For Fred it was still an honour, his love for the game and more importantly his love for his club driving him on for one last time. If Lovells thought the great man would take things easy, they were very mistaken. Fred Hayward decided to choose his last ever match by doing something he had never achieved before, he scored seven goals in a 12–1 victory. With that he put his well worn boots back in his kitbag and returned back to the town and family he loved.

Goal Record 
1 x 7 goals in a match 

3 x 6 goals in a match 

2 x 5 goals in a match 

14 x 4 goals in a match

27 x 3 goals in a match 

548 goals in total.

Honours 
Southern League Western Division: 1923–24

Bristol Charity League: 1921–22

Dorset District League:1908–09

Somerset Senior League: 1912–13, 1920–21

Forse Somerset Charity Cup: 1910–11, 1912–13

References 

1887 births
1958 deaths
English footballers
Association football forwards
People from Yeovil
Yeovil Town F.C. players
Western Football League players
Southern Football League players